Family Health was an American health magazine. The magazine was founded by Maxwell M Geffen in the 1969.  Its target audience was women. The publisher of the magazine was Family Media. In 1981 it was renamed Health. Hank Herman served as the editor-in-chief of the magazine, which ceased publication in 1991.

References

Defunct women's magazines published in the United States
Health magazines
Lifestyle magazines published in the United States
Magazines established in 1969
Magazines disestablished in 1991
Magazines published in New York City